Azaw (Āzāb ) is a village in Farah Province, in western Afghanistan. It is located beside the Azow (Azau) River.

Notes

External links
 "Azaw Map — Satellite Images of Azaw" Maplandia World Gazetteer

Populated places in Farah Province